(Hanja for Hangul:  Dong'gu),  (Simplified Chinese), or  (Japanese Higashi-ku), all literally meaning East District, may refer to the following:

Japan
Higashi-ku, Nagoya, Aichi Prefecture
Higashi-ku, Fukuoka, Fukuoka Prefecture
Higashi-ku, Hiroshima, Hiroshima Prefecture
Higashi-ku, Sapporo, Hokkaido Prefecture
 Higashi-ku, Kumamoto, Kumamoto Prefecture
Higashi-ku, Niigata City, Niigata Prefecture
Higashi-ku, Okayama, Okayama Prefecture
Higashi-ku, Sakai, Osaka Prefecture
Higashi-ku, Hamamatsu, Shizuoka Prefecture
 Higashi-ku, Osaka merged with Minami-ku into Chūō-ku, Osaka

Mainland China
Dongqu, Panzhihua, Sichuan
Dongqu Subdistrict, Zhongshan, Guangdong
Dongqu Subdistrict, Huaibei, in Xiangshan District, Huaibei, Anhui
Dongqu Subdistrict, Guangzhou, in Luogang District, Guangzhou, Guangdong
Dongqu Subdistrict, Yima, Henan

South Korea
Dong-gu, Busan
Dong-gu, Daegu
Dong-gu, Daejeon
Dong-gu, Gwangju
Dong-gu, Incheon
Dong-gu, Ulsan

Taiwan
East District, Chiayi
East District, Hsinchu
East District, Taichung
East District, Tainan

See also
Eastern Avenue (disambiguation)
Eastern District (disambiguation)